Bassirou Badji is a former Senegalese basketball player. Badji competed for Senegal at the 1980 Summer Olympics, where he scored 0 points in 6 games.

References

Year of birth missing (living people)
Living people
Senegalese men's basketball players
Olympic basketball players of Senegal
Basketball players at the 1980 Summer Olympics